Alastair Richard "Ali" Brogdon (born 10 November 1987) is a British and English field hockey player who competed at 2016 Rio Olympics for Team GB.

Brogdon made his international debut in 2006 and received his 100th England cap against Argentina at the 2014 Champions Trophy. He was part of the 2009 gold medal winning England side at the EuroHockey Championships. He competed for England in the men's hockey tournament at the 2014 Commonwealth Games where he won a bronze medal.

Brogdon was born in the winter of 1987, in Hale, Manchester growing in Bowdon, the youngest of three boys, both his older brothers, as well as his father and grandfather were pro hockey players. Bowdon is also where he played his club hockey until 2012. He has played club hockey for Wimbledon Hockey Club, Waterloo Ducks, HC Rotterdam and Bowdon Hockey Club.  Outside of hockey Alastair likes to play golf and has a handicap of 6.

References

External links
 
 
 
 
 

1987 births
Living people
Commonwealth Games bronze medallists for England
English male field hockey players
Field hockey players at the 2014 Commonwealth Games
Field hockey players at the 2016 Summer Olympics
Olympic field hockey players of Great Britain
British male field hockey players
Commonwealth Games medallists in field hockey
Wimbledon Hockey Club players
HC Rotterdam players
Waterloo Ducks H.C. players
Men's Belgian Hockey League players
Men's England Hockey League players
2010 Men's Hockey World Cup players
2014 Men's Hockey World Cup players
Medallists at the 2014 Commonwealth Games